Gary Anthony Grappo (born 1950) was the United States Ambassador to Oman from September 17, 2006, to June 1, 2009. 
 Prior to becoming ambassador, Grappo was Deputy Chief of Mission and Minister Counselor of the United States Mission in Riyadh, Saudi Arabia. He is currently a Distinguished Fellow at the Korbel School for International Studies at the University of Denver.

Grappo holds a BS in Mathematics from the United States Air Force Academy (1972), an MS in Geodesy and Survey Engineering from Purdue University, and an MBA from the Stanford University Graduate School of Business.

References

1950 births
Living people
Ambassadors of the United States to Oman
United States Air Force Academy alumni
Stanford Graduate School of Business alumni
Purdue University College of Engineering alumni